USS SC-743 was a United States Navy  which after service during World War II was transferred to the Philippine Navy in 1948.

The ship was laid down on 24 April 1942 at Julius Petersen Inc., Nyack, New York, launched on 26 August 1942, and commissioned on 27 February 1943. Assigned to the South West Pacific Area she was damaged by a dive bomber while covering the landings during the battle of Arawe, New Britain on 17 December 1943. She was transferred to the Philippine Navy on 2 July 1948.

References

External links
USS SC-743

 

SC-497-class submarine chasers
Ships built in Nyack, New York
1942 ships
SC-497-class submarine chasers of the Philippine Navy
Ships transferred from the United States Navy to the Philippine Navy